Difficult Loves is the fourth studio album released by Australian rock band Weddings Parties Anything.

The album was named after a Gabriel Garcia Marquez short story. The first single lifted from the album, "Father's Day" reached No. 29 on the Australian Singles Charts.

Track listing
All songs written by Mick Thomas.

 "Father's Day" – 4:03
 "Taylor Square" – 3:33
 "Difficult Loves" – 3:55
 "Old Ronny" – 5:06  
 "Telephone in Her Car" – 2:55
 "Nothin' But Time" – 3:23
 "Alone Amongst Savages" – 4:21
 "Rambling Girl" – 3:00
 "Step In, Step Out" – 3:59
 "The Four Corners of the Earth" – 4:45
 "For Your Ears Only" – 3:03
 "Do Not Go Gently" – 3:27

Personnel

Weddings Parties Anything
 Pete Lawler – bass guitar, vocals
 Marcus Schintler – percussion, drums, vocals
 Mick Thomas – guitar, vocals
 Paul Thomas – guitar, vocals
 Mark Wallace – accordion, vocals
 Jen Anderson – violin

Additional musicians
 Stan Armstrong – vocals
 Michael Barclay – vocals
 Ray Pereira – percussion
 Andy Reid – clarinet
 Conway Savage – piano
 Patricia Young – vocals

Charts

Certifications

References

1992 albums
Weddings Parties Anything albums